The 2022 Junior League World Series took place from August 14–21 in Taylor, Michigan. Taichung, Taiwan defeated Corpus Christi, Texas in the championship game. This was the first Junior Little League World Series since the COVID-19 pandemic.

Teams

Results

United States BracketInternational BracketElimination Round'''

References

Junior League World Series
Junior League World Series
Junior League World Series
Junior League World Series